Dick is a surname of English and Scottish origin.  Some notable individuals with the surname Dick include:

A
Adi Dick (1978–), New Zealand singer, songwriter, and producer
Alan Dick (1930–2002),  British sprinter
Albert Dick (1856–1934), American businessman
Alfred Dick (entrepreneur) (1865-1909), Swiss sports executive and entrepreneur
Alfred Dick (politician) (1927-2005), German politician and school teacher
Allan Dick (1915–1992), New Zealand politician
Allan Dick (1983–) Scottish field hockey goalkeeper
Allie Luse Dick (1859-1933), American music teacher
Amnon Dick, (born 1952) Israeli businessman
Andrew Dick (footballer) (1986–), English-born Scottish footballer
Andy Dick (1965–), American comedian, actor, voice artist, musician and TV/film producer
Auguste Dick (1910–1993), Austrian historian of mathematics

B
Barry Dick, Australian sports columnist
Billy Dick (1889–?), Australian rules footballer
Brad Dick (1988–), Australian rules footballer

C
Casey Dick (1986–) American college footballer
Charles W. F. Dick (1858–1945), American politician
Christian Dick (1883–1955), Norwegian sailor
Cressida Dick (1960–), Commissioner of London Metropolitan Police

D
Derek William Dick, birth name of Scottish singer Fish

E
Elisha C. Dick, mayor of Alexandria, Virginia, and attending physician at George Washington's death.

F
Florian Dick (1984–), German footballer
Franklin Archibald Dick (1823–1885), American jurist

G
George Dick (?–1818), governor of Bombay
George Dick (1921–1960), Scottish footballer
Gerry Dick, American journalist
Gradey Dick, American basketball player

H
Harold G. Dick (1907–1997), American mechanical engineer
Harry Dick (1920–2002), Canadian ice hockey player
Homer E. A. Dick (1884–1942), New York state senator

I
Ingrid Dick (1972–), Australian netball player
Irene Dick (1949–), Curaçaoan politician

J
James Dick (1743–1828), Scottish merchant
Jennifer K Dick (1970–), American poet, translator and educator
Jessie Alexandra Dick (1896–1976), Scottish artist
Johann Dick (1927–1986), citizen of West Germany who was shot dead on the Czechoslovakian border
Johann Friedrich Dick, German entrepreneur, founder of F. Dick
John Dick (1794–1872), American politician
John Dick (1876–?), Scottish footballer
John Dick (1919–), American basketball player
John Dick (1930–2000), Scottish footballer
John Dick (1957–), Canadian scientist
Sir John Dick-Lauder (1883–1958), British soldier
Jürgen Dick (Jurg) (1963-), Swiss curler.

K
Kirby Dick (1952–) American documentary film director
King Size Dick (1942-) German comedic musician singing in the Colognian language.

L
Larry Dick (1955–), American player of Canadian football
Lily Dick (born 1999), Australian women's national rugby sevens team player

M
Malcolm Dick, English rock drummer
Michael James Dick, birth name of American drummer Michael Clarke

N
Nancy E. Dick (1930–), Colorado's first female Lieutenant Governor 
Nigel Dick (1953–), English director, writer and musician

P
 Paul Dick (1940–2018), Canadian lawyer and politician
 Paul Revere Dick (1938–2014), American musician and leader of Paul Revere & the Raiders
 Philip K. Dick (1928–1982), American author whose published work was almost entirely in the science fiction genre

R
Robert Dick (1889–1983), English cricketer
Robert Dick (1811–1866), Scottish geologist and botanist
Robert Dick (1950–), American flutist and composer
Sir Robert Henry Dick (c. 1785–1846), Scottish soldier
Robert Dick Wilson (1856–1930), American linguist and Presbyterian scholar
Robert P. Dick (1823–1898) American jurist
Ross M. Dick (1912–1994) American journalist

S
Samuel Dick, (1740–1812), American physician and politician
Samuel Bernard Dick (1836–1907), American politician
Sheldon Dick (1906–1950), American publisher, literary agent, photographer and filmmaker
Stephen Dick  (1985–), Scottish field hockey player

T
Thomas Dick (1774–1857), Scottish church minister, science teacher and writer
Thomas Dick (1823–1900), New Zealand politician
Timothy Alan Dick (1953-), American comedian

U
Urs Dick (1960-), Swiss curler.

V
Vivienne Dick (1950–), Irish filmmaker

W
Walter Dick (1905–1989), Scottish-American footballer
Willen Dick (?–1947), Czechoslovakian ski jumper
William Thomas Dick (1865–1932), Australian politician
William Reid Dick (1879–1961), Scottish sculptor

Lists of people by surname